Jack Allen (born September 24, 1992) is a former American football center. He played college football for Michigan State. His younger brother Brian Allen was the 111th overall pick in the fourth round of the 2018 NFL Draft by the Los Angeles Rams.

Early years and college
Jack Allen attended Hinsdale Central High School in Hinsdale, Illinois. Jack was also a State Champion in wrestling while in high school. Jack received first-team Associated Press All-America honors in 2015 while playing for the Michigan State Spartans football team. That season, Jack scored a touchdown on a hand-off against Penn State.

Professional career

New Orleans Saints
On April 30, 2016, Jack Allen signed an undrafted free agent deal with the New Orleans Saints after going undrafted in the 2016 NFL Draft. On September 3, 2016, Jack was waived by the Saints and was signed to the practice squad. Jack was promoted to the active roster on December 10, 2016.

On August 23, 2017, Jack Allen was waived/injured by the Saints and placed on injured reserve.

Chicago Bears
On July 28, 2018, Jack Allen signed with the Chicago Bears. Jack was waived on August 4, 2018.

Kansas City Chiefs
On August 5, 2018, Jack Allen was claimed off waivers by the Kansas City Chiefs, but was waived two days later.

References

External links
 New Orleans Saints bio
 Michigan State Spartans bio

1992 births
Living people
People from Hinsdale, Illinois
Players of American football from Illinois
Sportspeople from DuPage County, Illinois
American football centers
Michigan State Spartans football players
All-American college football players
New Orleans Saints players
Chicago Bears players
Kansas City Chiefs players